Established in 1944, the RMIT University Student Union or RUSU, is the peak representative body for all students enrolled at RMIT University. The Student Union is independent of the university and operates under the direction of annually elected student representatives. According to the constitution, all students are automatic members of the Student Union but may choose to become a financial member. RUSU works in collaboration with its sister organisation the RMIT Vietnam Student Council to achieve common aims and objectives for all students.

The Student Union offers a range of services, including student rights advocacy, campus activities and events, funding student media including RMITV & Catalyst as well as hosting Women's, Queer and Postgraduate student lounges. RUSU is also responsible for funding and supporting over 100 clubs & societies that are either Academic, Cultural, Political, Social or Spiritual based. RMIT Link, which is run by the university (not the Student Union) funds and manages all Arts and Sports clubs. RUSU has offices at the three major Melbourne campuses and sites of RMIT University. RUSU is an affiliated body to the National Union of Students and the Council of Australian Postgraduate Associations.

History
John Storey Junior helped found the Student Representative Council in 1944, acted as its first President, and lobbied for the establishment of a central library. His studies were cut short when he was diagnosed with leukaemia and died in 1947, aged just 22. His recognition of service to the RMIT community lives on with one RMIT's most striking buildings – Storey Hall – in tribute to John Storey Junior and his father Sir John.
Over the years since its founding, the student union has continued to grow and expand into more areas to become an integral part of the student experience on campus.

In 2006, with the introduction of voluntary student unionism (VSU) legislation, the Student Union underwent a major reorganisation. Most of the staff were made redundant, the organisation's three separate campus councils were merged, and several services such as the second-hand bookshop were abandoned. While the organisation suffered a drastic funding cut (from $3.9 million AUD to $1.3 million AUD) as a result of VSU, it managed to survive the cutbacks and continue providing services, advocacy and representation to students.

Current structure

As of 2022, the Student Union Council has 28 voting members, who are elected by RMIT students at annual elections. Each Melbourne campus of RMIT (Brunswick, Bundoora and City) has a campus coordinator and a general campus representative as part of the 28 voting member structure.

Councillors are typically elected in September and hold November to October terms. Ex-officio (non-voting) members may be appointed to the Student Union Council at its discretion. All members of the Student Union Council must be financial members of the Student Union.

The Student Union Council meets regularly, and it is also responsible for electing the President and Communications Officer, as outlined in the Student Union Constitution. A smaller group of student office bearers, known as the Secretariat, meets more regularly to discuss day-to-day operational, staffing, and other urgent matters.

In addition to having student representatives as board directors of the organisation, the Student Union employs professional staff to help deliver key programs and services, and assist in governance. All staff members are supervised by an elected student representative as determined by the Secretariat.

Student media
The RMIT Student Union funds the student-run magazine Catalyst & student television on-campus production studios RMITV. It continues to have strong ties with SYN radio station located within RMIT, however there is no formal or funding relationship between the separate organisations.

Catalyst Magazine was first published in 1944, the same year the Student Union was established. It is one of two official student magazines and news sources on RMIT campus.

References

External links
 RMIT University Student Union website
 RMIT University website

Union, RMIT Student
Students' unions in Australia
Students' unions